was a Japanese noble of the early Edo period. He was the author of the "Mitsutoyo Diary" (光豊公記), which is considered a valuable source of information relating to the Edo period.

Samurai
Japanese diarists
1576 births
1612 deaths